The 2009 BBC Sports Personality of the Year Award, held on 13 December, was the 56th presentation of the BBC Sports Personality of the Year Awards. Awarded annually by the BBC, the main titular award honours an individual's British sporting achievement over the past year. The winner is selected by public vote from a 10-person shortlist. Other awards presented include team, coach, and young personality of the year.

Winner and nominees
The BBC Sports Personality of the Year is an annual sport award ceremony and the 2009 edition was its 56th staging. It occurred on the evening of 13 December, at the Sheffield Arena, Sheffield. For 2009, the BBC moved the awards from the Echo Arena, Liverpool to Sheffield to try and attract more spectators. It was the first time that the programme was held in Yorkshire, which was broadcast live in the United Kingdom on BBC One, the BBC Sport website and BBC Radio 5 Live. Sue Barker, Jake Humphrey and Gary Lineker presented the ceremony on the main stage, whilst Clare Balding, Matt Dawson, John Inverdale and Stephen Parry served as the backstage radio broadcasters.

Nominations for the award were conducted by a panel of 26 sport experts representing magazines and select national and regional newspapers. They were asked to choose ten nominees not in preference but in alphabetical order. Had there have been a tie after the nominating process, the production team would have asked six members of a panel of former winners for their first three preferences in order. There would be three points for first, two for second and one for third. The tied nominee with the highest number of points would subsequently advance to the final ten; had there been a second tie, another vote would be conducted to move the tied participant with the highest number of first places to the shortlist.

The ten nominees were announced on the BBC One programme The One Show on the evening of 30 November. The list was composed of two athletes from the sport of athletics, and one each from the sports of boxing, cricket, cycling, diving, football, Formula One, gymnastics and tennis. Jenson Button, the 2009 Formula One World Champion, was the bookmakers' initial favourite to win the accolade, followed heptathlete world champion Jessica Ennis and cricketer Andrew Strauss. In the week prior to the ceremony, the bookmakers moved footballer Ryan Giggs into contention and made him the more than likely winner during the programme.

Giggs was announced as the winner with 29.40 per cent of the public vote. Button finished runner-up with 18.74 per cent of the public vote and Ennis was third with a 15.58 per cent vote share. Giggs was the first footballer to be voted the recipient of the BBC Sports Personality of the Year award since David Beckham in 2001 and the fourth in history following Michael Owen in 1998, Paul Gascoigne in 1990 and Bobby Moore in 1966. Chris Hoy and Andrew Flintoff presented Giggs with the silver television camera and tripod trophy. The ten nominees and their 2009 achievements are described in the table below:

Other awards

Helen Rollason Award
The BBC Sports Personality of the Year Helen Rollason Award was presented to an individual "for outstanding achievement in the face of adversity." The winner was chosen by BBC Sport with no public vote and the name of the recipient was revealed on the night of the ceremony. Help for Heroes charity fundraiser Major Phil Packer, who raised money through sporting activities, was named the award's winner. Packer was presented with the accolade by Steve Redgrave.

Young Sports Personality
The BBC Young Sports Personality of the Year was presented to the sportsperson under the age of 16 on 1 January 2009 for "outstanding sporting achievements". The panel to decide the nominees and winner was chaired by Humphrey, and included the broadcasters Helen Skelton of Blue Peter, Ore Oduba from Sportsround, two representatives each from the Youth Sport Trust and the Sports Personality of the Year and two previous Young Sports Personality recipients in Harry Aikines-Aryeetey and Kate Haywood. The panel convened on 9 November to determine the first ten nominees from a BBC and Youth Sport Trust compiled list and returned a fortnight later to choose the first three and the recipient with the seven losing nominees informed that they did not make the final shortlist.

Tom Daley, the diver, was named the winner of the award. It was Daley's second win after his first in 2007 and he was the first person to earn the award more than once. He received the accolade from Amir Khan and Ellie Simmonds.

Unsung Hero Award
The BBC Sports Unsung Hero Award recognised "someone who is dedicating their life to promoting sport in their community, taking no reward from it other than the pleasure of helping others to take part and enjoy their sport." UK, Channel Islands and Isle of Man residents aged 16 or over but no previous winners, BBC employees and anybody working with the award or their close relatives was eligible to be nominated for the accolade on select BBC websites. A national panel of judges composed of leading sporting individuals, BBC Sport and BBC Nations and Regions representatives and a former Unsung Hero Award recipient determined the overall winner and two runners-up from all 15 BBC Nations and Regions. The winner of the award was announced during the show. Doreen Adcock, the Milton Keynes-based swimming instructor, was named the recipient; she received the accolade from the swimmer Rebecca Adlington and the snooker player Jimmy White.

Team of the Year 
The BBC Sports Team of the Year Award was given to "the (British only) team that has achieved the most notable performance in British sport." A 30-strong judging panel made up of sporting experts from select national and regional magazine and newspaper sports editors determined the winner. They voted for the first and second preferences as their first two selections, with two points going for first position and one point for second. The team with the highest number of points was selected to earn the Team of the Year. The team with the highest number of first positions would earn the award had a tiebreak been declared, although the accolade would be shared if a tie was still present.

England's 2009 Ashes winning cricket team was named the winners of the accolade for the second time after its first in 2005. Flintoff accepted the award on behalf of the team by Kelly Holmes while it was touring South Africa.

As part of the 2009 ceremony, awards were also to be presented for:
 Coach of the Year: Fabio Capello
 Overseas Personality: Usain Bolt
 Lifetime Achievement: Seve Ballesteros

Notes

References

BBC Sports Personality Of The Year Award, 2009
BBC Sports Personality Of The Year Award, 2009
BBC Sports Personality of the Year awards
2009 in British sport
BBC